This is a list of cities and towns with over 10,000 inhabitants (or lower if the municipality has over 20,000 inhabitants) in Bosnia and Herzegovina. For the full list of populated places, see List of populated places in Bosnia and Herzegovina.

Organization
Apart from entities, cantons and municipalities, Bosnia and Herzegovina also has officially designated cities. Official cities have their own mayor and city council, which is a big difference to the municipalities of Bosnia and Herzegovina, which have a municipal council and mayor. Powers of city councils of official cities are between the government of municipalities and government cantons in the Federation of Bosnia and Herzegovina or a government entity in Republika Srpska. There are thirty two official cities in Bosnia and Herzegovina (as of 2022):

Banja Luka
Bijeljina
Bihać
Bosanska Krupa
Cazin
Čapljina
Derventa
Doboj
Goražde
Gračanica
Gradačac
Gradiška
Istočno Sarajevo
Konjic
Laktaši
Livno
Lukavac
Ljubuški
Mostar
Orašje
Prijedor
Sarajevo
Srebrenik
Stolac
Široki Brijeg
Trebinje
Tuzla
Visoko
Zavidovići
Zenica
Zvornik
Živinice

List
The list includes only the 55 cities and towns whose administrative area has a population greater than 20,000. Istočno Sarajevo, with a population of 61,516 in its administrative area, is not included, since it is a city only in administrative sense and doesn't have a city proper.

"¤" indicates an official city.

See also
List of populated places in Bosnia and Herzegovina
List of settlements in the Federation of Bosnia and Herzegovina
Municipalities of Bosnia and Herzegovina
Municipalities of Republika Srpska

References

Notes

External links

Bosnia and Herzegovina, 2013 final results, map
2013 Census final results

Bosnia and Herzegovina, List of cities
Cities

simple:Bosnia and Herzegovina#Cities